William Stevens House may refer to:

William Stevens House (Clinton, Connecticut), listed on the NRHP (National Register of Historic Places)
William Stevens House (Kenton, Delaware), NRHP-listed

See also
Stevens House (disambiguation)